Trane or Rugde  is a neighbourhood in the city of Kristiansand in Agder county, Norway. It is located in the northern part of the borough of Vågsbygd and in the district of Slettheia. Trane/Rugde is northwest of Gislemyr, north of Nedre Slettheia, south of Rige, and east of Øvre Slettheia.

Transportation

References

Geography of Kristiansand
Neighbourhoods of Kristiansand